The Luanda Trial was a trial held in Luanda, Angola, in June 1976 during the Angolan Civil War. Thirteen Western mercenaries were sentenced to either long prison terms or execution by firing squad.

Background
Angola had gained its independence from Portugal on 11 November 1975, but the new country was immediately immersed in a three-sided civil war. The Popular Movement for the Liberation of Angola (MPLA) was supported by the Soviet Union and Cuba, while the United States and some of its allies backed the National Liberation Front of Angola (FNLA) and the National Union for the Total Independence of Angola (UNITA).

Thirteen mercenaries fighting for the FNLA – nine British, three American and one Irish – were captured by MPLA forces by mid-February 1976. On May 26, they were indicted by the People's Revolutionary Court in Luanda.

The MPLA Government invited a group of foreign observers to attend the trial. These included Jack Dromey, a British trade unionist who later became a Labour Party MP, and Stephen Sedley, later a UK High Court judge.

Trial
The trial lasted from June 11 to June 16. There were five judges. The presiding judge was Ernesto 
Teixeira da Silva, the Attorney General of Angola. The other judges were the Director of Angolan Television, two military officers and a member of the National Council of Women in Angola. Guilty verdicts were a foregone conclusion; before the trial had even begun, Luis de Almeida, the Director of Information and Security, stated that the defendants were guilty and that the only thing that needed to be determined was how much punishment to mete out. The following sentences were passed on June 28, 1976:

Execution by firing squad:
Costas Georgiou (aka "Colonel Tony Callan"), 25 (Cyprus/UK)
Andrew Gordon McKenzie, 25 (UK)
Derek John Barker, 35 (UK)
Daniel Francis Gearhart, 34 (US)

30 years' imprisonment:
Michael Douglas Wiseman (UK)
Kevin John Marchant (UK)
James George Butler (UK)
Gustavo Marcelo Grillo, 27 (Argentina/US)

24 years' imprisonment:
John Lawlor (UK)
Colin Evans (UK)
Cecil Martin "Satch" Fortuin (South Africa/UK)

16 years' imprisonment:
John Nammock (UK)
Gary Martin Acker, 21 (US)
Malcolm McIntyre (UK)

Some of the verdicts had been expected, especially regarding Callan; one of his fellow mercenaries described him as "a homicidal maniac, who spent a lot of time killing blacks just for fun". However, Gearhart had arrived in Angola only days before his capture; defense lawyers provided evidence he had never fired a shot, and probably had not even participated in combat. Acker, an ex-Marine, had been shot in the leg and taken prisoner in his very first taste of combat within five days after arriving in the country. British Prime Minister James Callaghan reportedly requested Angolan President Agostinho Neto to show mercy to the men.

Nevertheless, the four condemned men were executed by MPLA military police on July 10, 1976. According to British former mercenaries  
Chris Dempster and Dave Tomkins, only McKenzie was killed outright. Callan and Gearhart were killed by coup de grâce, while Barker, who was unscathed but had apparently fainted, was shot after waking up while his 'body' was being removed on a stretcher.

Aftermath
The two remaining Americans, Grillo and Acker, were released in November 1982 in a prisoner exchange worked out by the United States Department of State. The British prisoners were released in 1984 after negotiation by the British Foreign Office.

See also 
 Mercenaries in Angolan Civil War

Notes

Citations

Bibliography
Burchett, Wilfred and Roebuck, Derek. The Whores of War: Mercenaries Today
Kennedy, Bruce. Soldiers of misfortune CNN Interactive
Stockwell, John. In Search of Enemies: A CIA story
Cohen Jr., Sylvester, Review of In Search of Enemies: A CIA story, The Journal of Modern African Studies, Vol. 17, No. 2 (June 1979), pp. 342–344

External links
BBC article on the  Luanda Trial BBC On this day 11 June.
Interview with Dave Tomkins, former guerrilla
Angola: Death for War Dogs, Time magazine, July 12, 1976 

1976 in Angola
Mercenaries
Angolan Civil War
Trials in Angola
American people executed abroad
Executed English people
Angola–United Kingdom relations
Angola–United States relations